North Lynbrook is a hamlet and census-designated place (CDP) in the Town of Hempstead in Nassau County, on Long Island, in New York, United States. The population was 793 at the 2010 census.

History 
North Lynbrook was first created for the 2000 United States Census.

Geography

The hamlet is located between the Villages of Lynbrook and Malverne.

The ZIP code is Lynbrook's 11563.  Fire protection is provided by the Malverne Volunteer Fire Department. Police protecting falls under the jurisdiction of the Nassau County Police Department's 5th Precinct. And the community falls within the Malverne Union Free School District #12.

Demographics

As of the census of 2000, there were 742 people, 223 households, and 185 families residing in the CDP. The population density was 7,988.9 per square mile (3,183.2/km). There were 228 housing units at an average density of 2,454.8/sq mi (978.1/km). The racial makeup of the CDP was 89.35% White, 2.83% African American, 3.50% Asian, 3.50% from other races, and 0.81% from two or more races. 10.51% of the population were Hispanic or Latino.

There were 223 households, out of which 35.4% had children under the age of 18 living with them, 70.4% were married couples living together, 10.8% had a female householder with no husband present, and 16.6% were non-families. 13.5% of all households were made up of individuals, and 7.2% had someone living alone who was 65 years of age or older. The average household size was 3.02 and the average family size was 3.31.

In the CDP, the population was spread out, with 20.9% under the age of 18, 6.2% from 18 to 24, 24.1% from 25 to 44, 24.4% from 45 to 64, and 24.4% who were 65 years of age or older. The median age was 44 years. For every 100 females, there were 91.7 males. For every 100 females age 18 and over, there were 82.3 males.

The median income for a household in the CDP was $69,750, and the median income for a family was $79,841. Males had a median income of $36,667 versus $30,313 for females. The per capita income for the CDP was $30,951. About 2.6% of families and 2.9% of the population were below the poverty line, including 5.5% of those under age 18 and none of those age 65 or over.

Notable person

 Jeremiah Wood – Former Lieutenant Governor of New York.

See also 

 Malverne Park Oaks

References

Hempstead, New York
Census-designated places in New York (state)
Hamlets in New York (state)
Census-designated places in Nassau County, New York
Hamlets in Nassau County, New York